The men's K-1 200 metres canoe sprint competition at the 2015 European Games in Baku took place between 15 and 16 June at the Kur Sport and Rowing Centre in Mingachevir.

Schedule
The schedule was as follows:

All times are Azerbaijan Summer Time (UTC+5)

Results

Heats
Heat winners advanced directly to the A final. The next six fastest boats in each heat advanced to the semifinals.

Heat 1

Heat 2

Heat 3

Semifinals
The fastest three boats in each semi advanced to the A final.
The next four fastest boats in each semi, plus the fastest remaining boat advanced to the B final.

Semifinal 1

Semifinal 2

Finals

Final B
Competitors in this final raced for positions 10 to 18.

Final A
Competitors in this final raced for positions 1 to 9, with medals going to the top three.

Medal reallocation

References

Men's K-1 200m